
This is a list of bridges documented by the Historic American Engineering Record in the US state of Utah.

Bridges

See also
List of tunnels documented by the Historic American Engineering Record in Utah

References

List
List
Utah
Bridges, HAER
Bridges, HAER